The Niujie Mosque ( "Oxen Street House of Worship" or  "Oxen Street Mosque") is the oldest mosque in Beijing, China. It was first built in 996 during the Liao dynasty and was reconstructed as well as enlarged under the Kangxi Emperor (r. 1661–1722) of the Qing dynasty.

The mosque is located in the Niujie area of Beijing's Xicheng District, the spiritual centre for the 10,000 Muslims living in the vicinity and it is the biggest and oldest one in Beijing. It was within the Xuanwu District before it merged into Xicheng in 2010. Niujie in Xicheng District, where the mosque is located, is the largest area inhabited by Muslims in Beijing.

The Niujie Mosque covers an area of approximately 10,000 square meters. The mosque reflects a mixture of Islamic and Han Chinese cultural and architectural influences. From the outside, its architecture shows traditional Chinese influence and the inside has blend of Islamic calligraphy and Chinese design. The main prayer hall is 600 square meters in area, and can hold more than 1,000 worshipers. The mosque, built out of timber, is home to some important cultural relics and tablets such as the upright tablet of an emperor's decree proclaimed in 1694 during the Qing dynasty.

History
The Niujie Mosque, the largest of all the mosques in Beijing, was first built in 996 during the Liao dynasty (916–1125). The local Muslim community constructed the mosque using traditional Chinese architecture, with the exception that it displays Arabic calligraphy in the interior. It was originally designed by Nazaruddin, the son of an imam. After it was destroyed by armies of Genghis Khan in 1215, the mosque was rebuilt in 1443 in the Ming dynasty.

Muslim eunuchs contributed money in 1496 to repairing Niujie Mosque.

It was significantly expanded in 1696 under the Qing dynasty. During the Qing dynasty, the neighbouring markets were known for Halal beef and mutton, even until today, the presence is still quite strong with Muslim grocery stores with Arabic sign along the road. The actual name of the Mosque is Lǐbàisì, which is given by the Chenghua Emperor in 1474, since it is located in Oxen Street (Niú means Oxen and jiē means street) this Mosque is simply called Niujie. It is now one of the major mosques in north China.

The mosque has undergone three renovations since the founding of the People's Republic of China in 1949, respectively in 1955, 1979 and 1996.

As of 2002 the master plan of the renovation of Niujie stated that the mosque will remain at its current location and that a grassy area and large square would be developed around the mosque.

Architecture 
The mosque consists of group of buildings which follow the norms of traditional Chinese architecture. It has two courtyard according to the Siheyuan layout. Facilities include a worship hall, the Wangyue Building, Building for Publicising Etiquette, a lecture hall, the Tablet Pavilion, the Twin Pavilions, and bathrooms. The mosque is home to an ancient Quran over 300 years old, tombs of Arabian sages, and an incense burner dating from the Ming dynasty. The mosque also houses a library with ancient manuscripts.

Tourism and official visits
The Government of the People's Republic of China often uses the Niujie Mosque as a visiting site for delegations coming from Islamic countries. Han Chinese and Hui tourists and Muslims from outside of China visit the Niujie Mosque for tourism reasons.

While non-Muslims are not allowed to enter the prayer hall, people working at the mosque are quite friendly to all visitors and happy to talk about their beliefs with those who can speak Chinese. Visitors to the mosque may also be interested in the China Islamic Institute, which is just southeast, at the corner of Nanheng W. Road and Jiaozi Hutong.

Transportation
The mosque is accessible within walking distance south west of Caishikou Station of Beijing Subway.

Gallery

See also
Islam in China
Hui people in Beijing
History of Beijing
Timeline of Islamic history 
List of mosques in China
Islamic architecture
Islamic art

References

Mosques in Beijing
Xicheng District
Liao dynasty architecture
Major National Historical and Cultural Sites in Beijing
996 establishments
10th-century establishments in China
Religious organizations established in the 10th century
10th-century mosques